Gregory Paul may refer to:
Gregory S. Paul, American freelance researcher, author and illustrator who works in paleontology
Gregory Paul of Brzeziny (1525–1591), Socinian writer and theologian

See also

Gregory Paul Martin, British actor, writer and producer
Paul Gregory (disambiguation)